Rhopobota latipennis is a species of moth of the family Tortricidae. It is found in China (Heilongjiang, Jiangxi, Henan, Sichuan), Japan and the Russian Far East.

The larvae feed on Padus racemosa.

References

Moths described in 1900
Eucosmini